Bongaon High School  is a state funded higher secondary boys' school in Bongaon, North 24 Paraganas in the Indian state of West Bengal. It was established in 1864 and served as a birthplace of Dinabandhu Mahavidyalay, the only degree college in Bongaon.

The school is affiliated to West Bengal Board of Secondary Education for secondary education and West Bengal Council of Higher Secondary Education for higher secondary education.

Bibhutibhushan Bandyopadhyay, author of Pather Panchali (The Song of the Road), was one of the famous alumni. The school library is named after him.
 
Total student:-2250.
Total teacher:-55.
Stream offered:-science, arts, commerce.
Total school building:-8.
Total classroom:-67.

STREAM
1.SCIENCE.
2.ARTS.
3.COMMERCE.

Subjects offered
Bengali
English
History
Geography
Mathematics
Physics
Chemistry
Bio-science
Philosophy
Economics
Political science
Accountancy
Business economics & mathematics
Hindi
Sanskrit
Eco-geography
Statistics
Business studies
Costing and taxation
Company law and promises
Mordern computer applications
Physical education
Education
Computer science

Location 
The school is situated at Bongaon court road Bongaon, in North 24 Parganas, West Bengal.

SCHOOL FECELITY 
1. AUDITORIUM SEETING CAPASITY (400)
CENTRAL A.C(LALBARI)
2. SCHOOL MUSEUMS. (LALBARI)
3. SMART CLASS ROOM FULLY A.C(INDRANI)
4. BIO TOILET.
5. ALL TIME ELECTRICITY. 
6. GREEN GENEITOR. 
7. A.C COMPUTER  LAB.
8. SCIENCE  LABOTARY.
9. GEOGRAPHY  LABOTARY.
10. LIBRARY. 
11. MED-DAY MILL.
12. KANTINE.
13. CYCLE SHEED.
14. PRAYER IN THE CLASS.
15. PROJECTER IN CLASS ROOM
16. CALTURAL STAGE (ANUBARTAN).
17. STATUE OF FREEDOM FIGHTER, SOCIAL 
REFORMER, MATHAMATION, POET, AND OTHER  
NOVEL PERSON.
18. MULTI GYM.
19. 24 HOURS FRESH WATER.
20. SMART AND NEW SCIENCE CLASS ROOM.

References

External links
 WBCHSE. Institutions of 24 Pgs. (N). WBCHSE website. Retrieved 27 July 2012 
 WBCHSE. Boys' institutions in 24 Pgs. (N) West Bengal Council of Higher Secondary Education official website. Retrieved 27 July 2012

Boys' schools in India
High schools and secondary schools in West Bengal
Schools in North 24 Parganas district
Educational institutions established in 1864
1864 establishments in India